Patrice Delaveau (born 27 January 1965 in Rambouillet, France) is a French Olympic show jumping rider. He competed at two Summer Olympics (in 1996 and 2000). He finished 4th in team jumping on both occasions. Meanwhile, his current best individual Olympic placement is 35th position from 2000. 

Delaveau has won multiple medals at the World Championships level (three silver and one bronze). He also took part at two European Show Jumping Championships (in 1997 and 2013) and six editions of Show Jumping World Cup finals (in 1996, 2010, 2012, 2014, 2015 and 2016). He finished 4th twice at the European Championships, both times in the team event. 

He was previously married to Eugénie Angot (née Legrand), equestrian and daughter of composer Michel Legrand. They had a daughter, Camille Delaveau (born circa 1994). He subsequently married journalist Sabrine Delaveau. They had two daughters, Valentine (born circa 2002) and Capucine. Both Camille and Valentine followed in his footsteps.

References

Living people
1965 births
French male equestrians
Equestrians at the 1996 Summer Olympics
Equestrians at the 2000 Summer Olympics
Olympic equestrians of France
Mediterranean Games silver medalists for France
Mediterranean Games medalists in equestrian
Competitors at the 2005 Mediterranean Games